Harry Adams (1881 – 21 December 1946) was a South African cricket umpire. He stood in two Test matches between 1921 and 1928.

See also
 List of Test cricket umpires

References

1881 births
1946 deaths
Sportspeople from Cape Town
South African Test cricket umpires